Inversion recovery is an MRI sequence that provides high contrast between tissue and lesion. It can be used to provide high T1 weighted image, high T2 weighted image, and to suppress the signals from fat, blood, or cerebrospinal fluid (CSF).

Fluid-attenuated inversion recovery

Fluid-attenuated inversion recovery (FLAIR) is an inversion-recovery pulse sequence used
to nullify the signal from fluids. For example, it can be used in brain imaging to suppress cerebrospinal fluid  so as to bring out periventricular hyperintense lesions, such as multiple sclerosis  plaques. By carefully choosing the inversion time TI (the time between the inversion and excitation pulses), the signal from any particular tissue can be suppressed.

Turbo inversion recovery magnitude

Turbo inversion recovery magnitude (TIRM) measures only the magnitude of a turbo spin echo after a preceding inversion pulse, thus is phase insensitive.

TIRM is superior in the assessment of osteomyelitis and in suspected head and neck cancer. Osteomyelitis appears as high intensity areas. In head and neck cancers, TIRM has been found to both give high signal in tumor mass, as well as low degree of overestimation of tumor size by reactive inflammatory changes in the surrounding tissues.

Double Inversion Recovery
It is a sequence that suppress both cerebrospinal fluid (CSF) and white matter, and samples the remaining transverse magnetisation in fast spin echo, where the majority of the signals are from the grey matter. Thus, this sequence is useful in detecting small changes on the brain cortex such as focal cortical dysplasia and hippocampal sclerosis in those with epilepsy. These lesions are difficult to detect in other MRI sequences.

History
Erwin Han first used inversion recovery technique to determine the value of T1 (the time taken for longitudinal magnetisation to recover 63% of its maximum value) for water in 1949, 3 years after the nuclear magnetic resonance was discovered.

References

Magnetic resonance imaging
Nuclear magnetic resonance
Quantum mechanics